Vsyo snachala is the eighth studio album by Russian singer Irina Allegrova released in 2001.

Unlike previous albums, this one contains songs from different authors. Also on the record you can find two duets: with daughter Lala (the song "Mama") and with Igor Nikolaev (the song "Staryy znakomiy"). There are two cover versions on the album: the song "Smyateniye" by David Tukhmanov and "Nezhnost" by Alexandra Pakhmutova.

Video clips were shot for the songs "Bez viny vinovataya" and "Vsyo normalno", directed by Irina Mironova.

In the final of the program "Pesnya goda 2001" the singer presented two songs: "Mama" (solo version) and "Akkordeon", also in the qualifying round Irina performed the song "Bez viny vinovataya".

Track listing

References

2001 albums
Russian-language albums
Irina Allegrova albums